Talaurinus is a genus of weevils belonging to the family Curculionidae. The species of this genus are found in Australia. The genus first appeared in scientific literature in the Transactions of the Entomological Society of New South Wales, published by William MacLeay in 1865.

Selected species

Talaurinus confusus 
Talaurinus foveatus 
Talaurinus fergusoni 
Talaurinus hystrix 
Talaurinus perplexus 
Talaurinus regularis

References

Cyclominae
Curculionidae genera
Insects of Australia